Inka Raqay or Inkaraqay (Quechua Inka Inca, raqay ruin, a demolished building; shed, storehouse or dormitory for the laborers of a farm; a generally old building without roof, only with walls) is a small archaeological complex in Peru. It lies in the Apurímac Region, Abancay Province, Cachora District.

References 

Archaeological sites in Peru
Archaeological sites in Apurímac Region